Rilland-Bath is a former municipality in the Dutch province of Zeeland.

It was created from a merger of Rilland and Bath in 1878, and existed until it merged into the municipality Reimerswaal.

Transportation

 Railway station: Rilland-Bath

References

Populated places in Zeeland
Former municipalities of Zeeland
Reimerswaal (municipality)